Kashmiri kinship and descent is one of the major concepts of Kashmiri cultural anthropology. Hindu and Muslim Kashmiri people living in the Kashmir Valley of Jammu and Kashmir, India and other parts of the country and the world are from the same ethnic stock.

Kashmiri Hindus claim to be Saraswat Brahmins and are known by the exonym Pandit. The Muslims living in Kashmir are of the same stock as the Kashmiri Pandit community and are designated as Kashmiri Muslims. Kashmiri Muslims are descended from Kashmiri Hindus and are also known as 'Sheikhs'. Both the Kashmiri Hindus and Muslim society reckons descent patrilineally. Certain property and titles may be inherited through the male line, but certain inheritances may accrue through the female line.

Kashmiri Muslim tribes from Hindu Lineage
 Bhat, Butt
 Dhar, Dar
 Lone
 Mantu/Mantoo/Mintoo
 Ganai
 Tantray
 Mattoo
 Pandit
 Rajguru
 Rather
 Razdan
 Sapru
 Magre/Magray
 Yatoo
 Wani

See also 
 Kashmiris
 Kashmiri diaspora
 Kashmiri Muslims
 Kashmiri Pandit
 Kashmiris of Punjab
 List of Kashmiris
 Dynasties of ancient Kashmir
 History of Jammu and Kashmir

See also 
 Kashmiris
 Kashmiri diaspora
 Kashmiri Muslims
 Kashmiris of Punjab
 List of Kashmiris
 Dynasties of ancient Kashmir
 History of Jammu and Kashmir

References 

Indian castes
Social groups of Jammu and Kashmir
Muslim communities of India
Islam in Jammu and Kashmir